The Hinaki Bridge, also known as the Eel Trap Bridge, is a 20 metre long footbridge located in War Memorial Park (off Gifford Avenue), Mount Roskill, Auckland, New Zealand. The bridge spans over Oakley Creek and is used by cyclists and pedestrians. The culturally enriched architectural footbridge forms part of the wider Dominion Road Upgrade project led by Auckland Transport.

The design and construction team comprises Beca (bridge architects and engineers), Dempsey Wood (contractor) and Eastbridge (steel fabricators).

The concept for the bridge was developed by Beca in close collaboration with six iwi groups, the Puketapapa Local Board and Auckland Council Parks. The bridge is owned by Auckland Transport.

Background 
Beca began the concept stage in May 2014 and led the project through to stakeholder buy-in, detailed design, building consent, through to construction. Beca were responsible for Bridge Architecture, Landscape Design and Engineering for all works associated with the bridge. Strong consultations with Ngati Whatua Orakei, Ngati Tamaoho, Te Akitai Waiohua, Ngati Maru, Ngai Tai ki Tamaki, Ngati Te Ata, Puketapapa Local Board, Auckland Transport and Auckland Parks were prevalent throughout the duration of the project.

The steel work for the bridge was fabricated by Eastbridge (located in Napier) between October 2014 and February 2015. Construction began in January 2015 by Dempsey Wood.

The bridge was officially opened by a culturally significant dawn blessing attended by all stakeholders on 5 June 2015.

Engineering Design 

The bridge is a steel I-girder and timber footbridge. Plan and cross-sectional lateral stability is provided by EA and PFC members. The hinaki form itself is made of inner hoops and outer hoops. The purpose of using outer hoops only at midspan terminating at balustrade height, is to create a sense of openness and to also contrast the sense of tightness created by the full-height inner and outer hoops at each end of the bridge. The curving lines of the bridge are juxtaposed by a swarm of light and dark grey steel-plated eels, swimming towards the centre of the bridge.

Cultural Significance 
The design of the bridge reflects the shape of a traditional double-headed Maori hīnaki (eel trap). The bridge not only creates a unique user experience and leaves the local community with a bridge it can be proud of, but it also helps educate and share Maori culture with the local and regional communities.

The bridge embraces the craftsmanship of traditional Maori weaving patterns for eel traps traditionally used along Oakley Creek and reinterprets this into modern steel fabrication. The pavement surfaces, alignments, pou, lighting and interpretive signages (in both Maori and English), in combination with the bridge, showcases the cultural story of Tuna Roa.

The Story of Tuna Roa 

The architectural concept of the bridge is based on the legend of Maui and Tuna Roa

References 

Bridges in Auckland
Transport in Auckland
Pedestrian bridges in New Zealand
2010s architecture in New Zealand
Transport buildings and structures in the Auckland Region